Benque Viejo del Carmen United is a Belizean football team which currently competes in the Belize Premier Football League.  The Team is based in the western town of Benque Viejo del Carmen.  Their home stadium is Edmund Marshalleck Stadium.

History
The team was founded in July, 2004 as Benque Viejo Del Carmen UNITED and has not been affiliated to Benque FC which played in the Cayo First Division. During the 2005–06 season, Benque DC UNITED competed in the RFG Insurance Cup and in 2008 they played in the Super League of Belize, in the semi-professional division, placed first in the inaugural marathon and second in the tournament finals. It was the brain child and effort of one town resident who chooses to remain anonymous. Currently they are reorganizing with young players and are known as DC YOUTH. Plans are to compete in the Super League of Belize in the very near future.

Current squad

Football clubs in Belize